NWSA may refer to:
News Corp's NASDAQ ticker symbol for Class A stock
New World School of the Arts, a public high school in Miami, Florida
National Woman Suffrage Association, of 1869 which became the National American Woman Suffrage Association in 1890
North Wales Society of Architects, a branch of the Royal Society of Architects in Wales
Northwest Service Academy, an AmeriCorps program in the Pacific Northwest
Northwest School of Agriculture, a program at University of Minnesota Crookston
Northwest School of the Arts, a public high school in Charlotte, North Carolina
National Water and Sanitation Authority; see Water supply and sanitation in Yemen
National Women's Studies Association, publishes Feminist Formations